John Flowers (born June 13, 1989) is an American professional basketball player for Club Atlético Peñarol of the Liga Uruguaya de Básquetbol.

His mother Pam Kelly-Flowers is a member of the Women's Basketball Hall of Fame. As a senior at St. Mary's Ryken High School, he averaged 18 points and 13.2 rebounds. Flowers committed to coach John Beilein at West Virginia in college and honored his commitment after Beilein left. As a senior he averaged 9.2 points per game. He reached the Final Four with West Virginia in 2010. After graduating, Flowers played his first year of professional basketball in Japan.

On August 3, 2019, Flowers signed with Soles de Mexicali in Mexico. He averaged 13 points, 4 rebounds and 2 assists per game. Flowers signed with Boulazac on June 9, 2020. He averaged 13.5 points, 3.6 rebounds, and 1.1 assists per game. On September 1, 2021, Flowers signed with Club Atlético Peñarol of the Liga Uruguaya de Básquetbol.

References

External links
RealGM profile

1989 births
Living people
American expatriate basketball people in France
American expatriate basketball people in Germany
American expatriate basketball people in Japan
American expatriate basketball people in Mexico
American expatriate basketball people in Venezuela
American men's basketball players
Basketball players from Maryland
Boulazac Basket Dordogne players
Cocodrilos de Caracas players
People from Waldorf, Maryland
Small forwards
Soles de Mexicali players
West Virginia Mountaineers men's basketball players